The 2022–23 Tennessee Tech Golden Eagles women's basketball team represents Tennessee Technological University during the 2022–23 NCAA Division I women's basketball season. The Golden Eagles, led by seventh year head coach Kim Rosamond, play their home games at the Eblen Center as members of the Ohio Valley Conference (OVC).

Roster

Schedule and results

|-
!colspan=9 style=| Exhibition

|-
!colspan=9 style=| Non–conference regular season

|-
!colspan=9 style=| Ohio Valley Conference regular season

|-
!colspan=9 style=| Ohio Valley Conference tournament

|-
!colspan=9 style=| NCAA Women's Tournament

See also
 2022–23 Tennessee Tech Golden Eagles men's basketball team

References

Tennessee Golden Eagles
Tennessee Tech
Tennessee Golden Eagles women's basketball
Tennessee Golden Eagles women's basketball
Tennessee Tech Golden Eagles women's basketball seasons